The Asian Journal of International Law is a peer-reviewed law review focusing on public and private international law. It is an official publication of the Asian Society of International Law and is published by Cambridge University Press. It is produced by the National University of Singapore Faculty of Law and succeeds the Singapore Year Book of International Law. The editors-in-chief are Antony Anghie, Simon Chesterman, and Tan Hsien-Li.

The first issue, published in January 2011, included articles by leading Asian scholars and practitioners such as Hisashi Owada, Xue Hanqin, B. S. Chimni, Tommy Koh, Onuma Yasuaki, and Michael Hwang.

The launch of the Journal was welcomed as, perhaps, exemplifying a newly assertive Asia challenging the West in intellectual as well as economic terms.

The journal is abstracted and indexed in Scopus.

See also 

 American Journal of International Law
 European Journal of International Law

References

External links 
 

International law journals
Biannual journals
Cambridge University Press academic journals
Publications established in 2011
English-language journals
Academic journals associated with universities and colleges
Academic journals associated with learned and professional societies